Constantine Dillon (born 1953), usually known as Costa, is a retired U.S. National Park Service Superintendent and a writer and actor of Greek ancestry.  He is most famous as the creator of the film Attack of the Killer Tomatoes!  and its sequels: Return of the Killer Tomatoes!, Killer Tomatoes Strike Back! and Killer Tomatoes Eat France; he also wrote the film Happy Hour.

Biography

Early life 
Dillon, a Greek American (his grandfather's family name was Anglicized from Deligianis), was born in Norwich, Connecticut, to parents who were second-generation Greeks. There is a street in Norwich named after his grandfather who was a carpenter and who built houses there. His father, a career U.S. Marine, moved about the country and Dillon eventually ended up in San Diego. Dillon and his family were active members of St. John the Baptist Greek Orthodox Parish in Omaha, Nebraska, where he was an altar boy. (Alexander Payne, the film director, was also an altar boy for this parish.)

Career
Dillon began making films in high school with his friends John DeBello, Steve Peace, and Mike Grant. The group took 3rd place in the 1971 National Kodak Teenage Film Festival and won the 1972 Shasta Film Festival. They then established Four Square Productions, a film company in San Diego and began making sports films. The group later formed Killer Tomato Entertainment, Inc. which produced the four Killer Tomato films as well as Happy Hour.

Dillon is a retired career employee of the National Park Service. Dillon has had a parallel career with the National Park Service and has worked in numerous national parks, including Gettysburg National Military Park. He was the superintendent of the National Park Service Horace M. Albright Training Center and the acting Chief of Learning and Development for the National Park Service in 2006–2007. He formerly served as Superintendent of Homestead National Monument of America, Fire Island National Seashore, and Indiana Dunes National Lakeshore. He is a recipient of the National Park Conservation Association's Stephen T. Mather award from the Sequoia Award for outstanding contributions to park interpretation, and the Secretary of the Interior's Award for Long-Term  achievement in Diversity, and the Department of the Interior's Meritorious Service Award

While at Fire Island, he also received commendations from the New York State Legislature and the Suffolk County Legislature for his accomplishments there. He is a recipient of two awards from the Urban League for achievements in diversity. He is an admiral in the Nebraska Navy.

Dillon is a graduate of the University of California, Davis and the University of Colorado.

Killer Tomatoes
Dillon created the concept of Killer Tomatoes as a short film in college. It was later made as a feature film, now famous, at a cost of less than $100,000. Finding a new audience as one of the first films to be available on VHS, the movie developed a cult following that led to three sequels, including Return of the Killer Tomatoes starring George Clooney. A cartoon show was aired on Fox 1990–1992 Attack of the Killer Tomatoes. The term "killer tomato" has often been used as shorthand for the fear of genetically engineered food and was used by the media extensively during the tomato salmonella outbreak in spring 2008.

Other feature films include Killer Tomatoes Strike Back (writer, actor), Killer Tomatoes Eat France (writer, actor), and Happy Hour (writer, actor, production design).

References

External links
 
 
National Parks Traveler Podcast

1953 births
Living people
American people of Greek descent
National Park Service personnel
University of Colorado Denver alumni
University of California, Davis alumni